Carlos Daniel Albornoz Cabrera (born 26 December 2000) is a Cuban chess player. He was awarded the title of Grandmaster (GM) by FIDE in 2019. He is the 2nd best player in Cuba.

In 2018, he won the 30th Carlos Torre Memorial, finishing with 7/9 points and beating Lelys Stanley Martinez Duany, Yuri González Vidal, and Evgeny Shtembuliak on tie-break. In 2009, he won the 31st Carlos Torre Repetto Memorial, again scoring 7/9 points and beating on tie-break Luis Fernando Ibarra Chami, Elier Miranda Mesa, and Bartłomiej Macieja. In 2022, he won the Zonal 2.3 tournament in San Pedro de Macorís with a score of 7.5/9.

He played in the Chess World Cup 2019, where he was defeated by Peter Svidler in the first round.

References

External links 
 
 Carlos Daniel Albornoz Cabrera chess games at 365Chess.com
 
 

2000 births
Living people
Chess grandmasters
Cuban chess players
People from Camagüey